Ciocârlia is a commune located in Ialomița County, Muntenia, Romania. It is composed of two villages, Ciocârlia and Cotorca.

References

Communes in Ialomița County
Localities in Muntenia